Dumpling Rocks Light is a light on a skeleton tower on Dumpling Rock, Buzzards Bay, Massachusetts. It replaced the wooden Dumpling Rock Light, built 1889, which in turn replaced the original stone lighthouse established in 1829.

References

Lighthouses completed in 1829
Lighthouses completed in 1889
Lighthouses in Barnstable County, Massachusetts